Halsua is a municipality of Finland.

It is located in the province of Western Finland and is part of the Central Ostrobothnia region.

Neighbouring municipalities are Kaustinen, Kokkola, Lestijärvi, Perho and Veteli.

The municipality is unilingually Finnish.

Politics
Results of the 2011 Finnish parliamentary election in Halsua:

Centre Party   53.7%
True Finns   28.6%
Christian Democrats   8.5%
Social Democratic Party   4.5%
National Coalition Party   2.2%
Left Alliance   0.8%
Green League   0.5%
Swedish People's Party   0.4%

See also
Halsuanjoki

References

External links

Municipality of Halsua – Official website 

 
Populated places established in 1868